Liaocheng, is a prefecture-level city in western Shandong province, China. It borders the provincial capital of Jinan to the southeast, Dezhou to the northeast, Tai'an to the south, and the provinces of Hebei and Henan to the west.  The Grand Canal flows through the city center. Its population was 5,789,863 at the 2010 census whom 1,229,768 lived in the built-up area made up of Donchangfu district, even though large parts remain rural.

During the Song dynasty, the area of present-day Liaocheng included the prefectures of Bo and Ji.  In 2007, the city is named China's top ten livable cities by Chinese Cities Brand Value Report, which was released at 2007 Beijing Summit of China Cities Forum.

Administration
The prefecture-level city of Liaocheng administers eight county-level divisions, including two districts, one county-level city, and five counties.
 Dongchangfu District
 Chiping District
 Linqing City
 Yanggu County
 Dong'e County
 Gaotang County
 Guan County
 Shen County

These are further divided into 134 township-level divisions.

Climate

Education
 Liaocheng University
 Liaocheng NO.1 high school

History

People's Republic of China
In August 1949, Liaocheng was detached from Shandong and attached to Pingyuan. In November 1952, Pingyuan was dissolved and Liaocheng returned to Shandong.

Notable people
 Fu Sinian (1896–1950)
 Ji Xianlin (1911–2009)
 Kong Fansen (1944–1994)
 Wei Fenghe (b.1954)
 Chen Xu (b. 1962)

Attractions

 Shanxi-Shaanxi Assembly Hall (short Shanshan Hall)
 Guangyue Tower
 Iron Tower
 Lion Building (site where - according to legend - Song Wu fought and killed Ximen Qing)
 Linqing Mosque

Transportation 
The town is served by Liaocheng railway station. A station on the high-speed network, Liaocheng West railway station, is under construction.

Sister cities

Liaocheng is a sister city of the following cities:
 Uiryeong County, South Gyeongsang, South Korea (since June 7, 2001)
 Blacktown, New South Wales, Australia (October 14, 2003)
 Gwangmyeong, Gyeonggi, South Korea (May 3, 2005)
 Naberezhnye Chelny, Tatarstan, Russia (since 2009)
Furthermore, there is a partnership with the district Offenbach in Germany.

References

External links

 Government website of Liaocheng (available in Chinese, English, Japanese and Korean)

 
Cities in Shandong
Prefecture-level divisions of Shandong